Éric Hély (born 25 October 1964, in Dourdan) is a French former professional footballer and manager. He played as a defender.

On 8 March 2012, as Sochaux caretaker manager, he began the task of keeping Ligue 1's bottom club in the top flight when they faced Evian. Hély was handed the reins until the end of the season following the sacking of Mehmed Baždarević. On 26 September 2013 he resigned, after seven games without a win.

Managerial statistics

References

External links
Eric Hély profile at chamoisfc79.fr

1964 births
Living people
People from Dourdan
French footballers
Association football defenders
FC Sochaux-Montbéliard players
Stade Brestois 29 players
Chamois Niortais F.C. players
Olympique Alès players
Louhans-Cuiseaux FC players
Ligue 1 players
Ligue 2 players
SO Châtellerault players
French football managers
FC Sochaux-Montbéliard managers
Footballers from Essonne